Hugh and Leona Rank House is a historic home located in Marion Township, Jasper County, Indiana.  The International Style dwelling was built in 1964, and has a curved design constructed of concrete block and vertical wood siding.  It is one-story with a flat roof and consists of a hallway circling a central interior courtyard to connect rooms fanning off of it.

It was listed on the National Register of Historic Places in 2016.

References

Houses on the National Register of Historic Places in Indiana
Modernist architecture in Indiana
Houses completed in 1964
Buildings and structures in Jasper County, Indiana
National Register of Historic Places in Jasper County, Indiana